McGurk Meadow is a meadow in Yosemite National Park located near Bridalveil Fall.

References

Landforms of Yosemite National Park
Landforms of Mariposa County, California
Tourist attractions in Mariposa County, California